Dina McPherson is an Australian born film and television creator, writer, producer, director and composer.

References

Living people
Showrunners
Television show creators
Australian screenwriters
Australian television producers
Australian women television producers
Australian film producers
Women television writers
Year of birth missing (living people)